Pak! Pak! My Dr. Kwak!  is a 2011 Filipino comedy drama film starring Vic Sotto and Bea Alonzo and produced by OctoArts Films, M-Zet Productions, and APT Entertainment and released by Star Cinema. It is Vic Sotto's comeback to Star Cinema after 14 years.

Synopsis
Angelo  dreams of creating a medicine that could cure his father’s illness. With some knowledge about medicinal herbs, he makes a living as a faith healer. Everyone believes him, except Cielo Delos Santos, a doctor who swears to do everything to uncover Angelo’s secret.

Things get a little complicated when Angelito (Zaijian Jaranilla), an exiled angel comes down to earth to help Angelo become a better man. As the three of them try to achieve their own goals, they realize that they need each other more than they are willing to admit.

Cast

Main Cast
Vic Sotto as Angelo The Great Pak Healer/Ka Olegna
Bea Alonzo as Dra. Cielo Delos Santos
Zaijan Jaranilla as Saint Angelito
Xyriel Manabat as Maisie
Pokwang as Pining
Wally Bayola as Phil
Jose Manalo as James

Supporting cast
Paolo Ballesteros as Anton
Joonee Gamboa as Juan
Dexter Doria as Ester delos Santos 
Victor Basa as Ricky
Ryan Yllana as Paeng
Jon Avila as Marcus
Peque Gallaga as San Pedro
Johnny Revilla as Dr. John Fuentes
Bella Flores
Thou Reyes as Dr. Reyes
Paw Diaz as Dr. Diaz
Charles Christianson as Dr. Charles
Romeo Rivera as Don Ramon
Ace Veloso as Ace
Jackie Aquino as DSWD Officer

Special Participation
Anjo Yllana as Doctor Yllana
Joey de Leon as Doctor Joey
Toni Rose Gayda as Sister Mary

Production
Toni Gonzaga was the original choice to play the role Dra. Cielo Delos Santos which will be the love interest of Vic Sotto's character. This should be the reunion of Gonzaga and Sotto after being co-host in Eat Bulaga! back in 2002. However, due to Toni's conflicting schedule because of other showbiz commitments, Bea Alonzo was tapped to replace Toni Gonzaga in the movie.

Reception
The film has been graded 'B' by the Cinema Evaluation Board of the Philippines.

See also
 List of films about angels

References

2011 films
Philippine comedy-drama films
2010s Tagalog-language films
Films about Christianity
Films about angels
Star Cinema films
OctoArts Films films
APT Entertainment films
2011 comedy films
M-Zet Productions films
2010s English-language films
Films directed by Tony Y. Reyes
Films about faith healing